Maria-Luise Rainer (born 23 April 1959 in South Tyrol) is an Italian luger who competed between the late 1970s and the late 1980s.

Competitive career
Rainer won the bronze medal in the women's singles event at the 1979 FIL World Luge Championships in Königssee, West Germany.  In addition, she won two medals at the FIL European Luge Championships with a silver (women's singles, 1980) and a bronze (mixed team, 1988). Rainer also won the overall Luge World Cup title in women's singles in the 1985–86 season.

Competing in four Winter Olympics (1976–1988), Rainer had her best finish of sixth in the women's singles event at Sarajevo in 1984.

Later career
Later in her career, Rainer served as race director of the women's singles event at the 2006 Winter Olympics in Torino. Rainer has had a lengthy career with the International Luge Federation (FIL), serving as Senior Technical Director at FIL World Cup and World Championship competitions throughout Europe and North America.

References

External links
 
 
 
  
 
  
 
 

Italian lugers
Italian female lugers
Living people
Lugers at the 1976 Winter Olympics
Lugers at the 1980 Winter Olympics
Lugers at the 1984 Winter Olympics
Lugers at the 1988 Winter Olympics
Olympic lugers of Italy
1959 births
Sportspeople from Sterzing